Bethel is a census-designated place (CDP) and the primary village in the town of Bethel, Oxford County, Maine, United States. It is in the southwestern part of the town, south of the Androscoggin River. U.S. Route 2 passes through the northwest side of the CDP, leading northeast  to Rumford and west  to Gorham, New Hampshire. Maine State Route 5 joins Route 2 in Bethel but runs south through the village center and continues southwest  to Fryeburg. State Route 26 leads southeast from Bethel  to South Paris.

Bethel was first listed as a CDP prior to the 2020 census.

Demographics

References 

Census-designated places in Oxford County, Maine
Census-designated places in Maine
Bethel, Maine